HSLS refer to:

 Hazy Sighted Link State Routing Protocol, a wireless network routing algorithm
 Slovak People's Party
 Croatian Social Liberal Party

See also 
 HSL (disambiguation)